Qarah Qurtan (also Romanized as Qarah Qūrtān; also known as Ghara Ghoorkhan, Qarah Qūrqān, Qarāqorqān, Qara Qurghān, Qarā Qūrkhān, Qareh Qorqān, and Qareh Qūrqān) is a village in Dodangeh-ye Sofla Rural District, Ziaabad District, Takestan County, Qazvin Province, Iran. At the 2006 census, its population was 117, in 28 families.

References 

Populated places in Takestan County